The Polygonal Barn, Lincoln Township was an historic building located in Lincoln Township in rural Johnson County, Iowa, United States. It was built in 1880 by George Frank Longerbean. The barn was an 8-sided structure and has subsequently been torn down. It featured a bell shaped roof of curving hand-laminated beams. The building was listed on the National Register of Historic Places in 1986.

References

Infrastructure completed in 1880
Buildings and structures in Johnson County, Iowa
National Register of Historic Places in Johnson County, Iowa
Barns on the National Register of Historic Places in Iowa
Polygonal barns in the United States